"I'd Love You All Over Again is a song written and recorded by American country music artist Alan Jackson. It was released in January 1991 as the last single from his debut album, Here in the Real World and the song was Jackson's first number 1 single on the Billboard Hot Country Singles & Tracks chart, as well as his second number 1 on the Canadian RPM Country Tracks chart. This was also Jackson's first single not to have an accompanying music video.

Content
The song is told from the point of view of a husband celebrating his 10th anniversary. He states that if he had the chance to love his wife for the first time again, he would. The song was written for Alan's wife, Denise in a hotel room in Pine Bluff, Arkansas on a rainy evening.

Critical reception
Kevin John Coyne of Country Universe gave the song an A grade," saying that the song "showcases a particular skill that Jackson has as a songwriter. He can include a clever turn of phrase without it sounding forced, or worse, distracting from the overall mood."

Peak chart positions

Year-end charts

References

1991 singles
1990 songs
Alan Jackson songs
Songs written by Alan Jackson
Song recordings produced by Keith Stegall
Song recordings produced by Scott Hendricks
Arista Nashville singles